Manuel "Manolo" Jiménez González (born 12 September 1960) is a Spanish football manager.

Career
Jimenez was born in Madrigalejo, but raised in Benidorm. He started in the Benidorm CD coaching youth football. His big break came in the Hércules CF. Got promoted to La Liga in 1995–96. Hércules did not renew for return to the top flight, and had two more chances in the second level with Albacete Balompié and Real Jaén CF. In Albacete was sacked at 5 league matches. At Real Jaén in 2 times down the third level. He also had a second time on Hércules CF and fell to third level. After the third level trained in Hércules, Benidorm and UE Figueres. In the 2008–09 season was the sports director of Alicante CF and arrived several days to train the team in the second level, being sacked because of disagreements with the policy. He is currently the coach of the Valencian Community on UEFA Regions' Cup.

References

External links
 

1960 births
Living people
Sportspeople from the Province of Cáceres
Spanish football managers
Hércules CF managers
Albacete Balompié managers
Real Jaén managers
UE Figueres managers
Alicante CF managers